Armistice Day is a day (11 November) to mark the armistice that ended World War I.

It may also refer to:
Armistice Day (album), a live album by Australian rock band Midnight Oil
Armistice Day (song), a song on the album
Armistice Day (United States), original name of the U.S. federal holiday Veterans Day